Santolina pinnata, called lavender cotton along with other members of its genus, is a species of flowering plant in the family Asteraceae, native to northwest Italy. Its putative subspecies Santolina pinnata subsp. neapolitana, the rosemary-leaved lavender cotton, has gained the Royal Horticultural Society's Award of Garden Merit.

References

Anthemideae
Endemic flora of Italy
Plants described in 1802